Roseville Community Schools is a school district headquartered in Roseville, Michigan in Metro Detroit.

The school district was formed in 1952 by the merger of part of the former Kern Road Schools district and Burton School District. In 1956 the district annexed Eastland Community School District. In 1960 it annexed Greater Gratiot Schools to achieve its current boundaries.

Schools
High Schools
 Roseville High School
Middle Schools
 Eastland Middle School
 Roseville Middle School
Elementary Schools
 Dort
 Fountain
 Huron Park
 Kaiser
 Kment
 Patton
 Steenland

References

External links
Roseville Community Schools

School districts in Michigan
Education in Macomb County, Michigan
1952 establishments in Michigan